Blair Simon Kinghorn (born 18 January 1997) is a Scottish professional rugby union footballer who plays as a utility back for Edinburgh Rugby in the United Rugby Championship and the Scotland national team. Although he primarily plays as a fullback, he can also play as a wing and at fly-half.

Edinburgh

Edinburgh signed Kinghorn on a two-year professional contract straight from Edinburgh Academy.

He made his professional debut as a 70th-minute substitute in Edinburgh's match against Zebre in the 2015–16 Pro12. For the last play of the game, a penalty attempt from inside Zebre's half, he was called on to take the kick, though it fell inches short.

Youth

Kinghorn has represented Edinburgh at under-17, under-18 and under-20 level and Scotland at under-18 and under-20 level.

Kinghorn was a National Youth League Cup winner with Currie at under-16 level and formerly a member of Heart of Midlothian's Youth Academy.

He said: "When I was younger, football was my main interest, then I started to play rugby at school. Some of my mates went to play for Currie so I went along with them, then things escalated at under-16 level. I began playing for the school first XV and since then it's been my goal to play professionally."

International

In January 2018 he was called up to the senior Scotland squad for the 2018 Six Nations Championship.

He went on to make his debut at Murrayfield in a 25-13 win against England.

He then went on to earn his first international start, on the wing, in a 28-8 loss to Ireland. He scored Scotland's only try of the match. He played in all three matches during his first tour with Scotland - to the Americas in the summer of 2018 - scoring tries against the USA and Argentina.

In Scotland's 2019 campaign he scored three tries in their first match against Italy. He scored another hat trick against Italy in 2023, also scoring against Wales earlier in the tournament. 

Kinghorn was selected in the 31 man squad for the 2019 Rugby World Cup.

References

External links
 

Edinburgh Rugby - Blair Kinghorn

1997 births
Living people
Scottish rugby union players
People educated at Edinburgh Academy
Edinburgh Rugby players
Rugby union players from Edinburgh
Scotland international rugby union players
Rugby union fullbacks
Rugby union wings